The Piasecki HUP Retriever/H-25 Army Mule is a compact single radial engine, twin overlapping tandem rotor utility helicopter developed by the Piasecki Helicopter Corporation of Morton, Pennsylvania. Designed to a United States Navy specification, the helicopter was produced from 1949 to 1954, and was also used by the United States Army and foreign navies. The HUP/H-25 was the first helicopter to be produced with an autopilot and also the first to perform a loop.

Design and development
The design was a product of a competition by the U.S. Navy in 1945 for a compact utility/rescue helicopter to operate from ships including aircraft carriers, battleships, and cruisers. Either 2 or 3 prototypes—designated PV-14 by the factory and XHJP-1 by the Navy—were built and subjected to a side-by-side flight evaluation against the 3 prototypes of the Sikorsky XHJS-1; however, the XHJS was fundamentally a scaled-up version of the Sikorsky H-5, and the increased weight and size magnified the design's problems with maintaining proper weight and balance under varying loading conditions. The Piasecki won the competition, and with the introduction of the aircraft configuration letter "U" for Utility in the 1950s, the aircraft was ordered for production as the HUP-1.

The design featured two three-bladed,  rotors in tandem in which blades could be folded for storage; the relatively small rotor diameter allowed the aircraft to use aircraft carrier elevators with its blades fully extended. The tandem overlapping rotor configuration was a development by Piasecki and was used in future helicopter designs by the company and successors including the H-21, HRB-1/CH-46, and CH-47. To aid search and rescue (SAR) operations, the aircraft was equipped with an overhead winch capable of lifting 400 lb (181 kg), which could lower a rescue sling through an electrically-operated door available after the copilot's seat was folded forward.

During a flight demonstration of its capability to withstand high g-force, the type became the first helicopter to perform a loop, albeit unintentionally.

Operational history

The aircraft first entered service in February 1949 with the delivery of the first of 32 HUP-1 aircraft to the US Navy.   The improved HUP-2 (Piasecki designation PV-18) was soon introduced with a more powerful engine, deletion of the inward-canted horizontal stabilizer endplate fins, and various minor changes in equipment; a sub-variant equipped with dunking sonar for anti-submarine warfare was given the designation HUP-2S. The HUP-2 was the first production helicopter equipped with an autopilot. The US Navy also tested a radio navigation system called Raydist that allowed an unmanned HUP-2 to be directed from a ground station and by radio ordered to hover within  of the desired point. Edo tested a HUP-2 with a fiberglass hull and outrigger floats for amphibious operations.

An upgraded version of the HUP-2 was built for the US Army and designated as the H-25A Army Mule, but most were quickly withdrawn from Army service and converted for naval use under the designation HUP-3.

In 1954, the Royal Canadian Navy received three former US Army H-25A aircraft, which were modified and redesignated on delivery to conform to US Navy HUP-3 standards. The aircraft were used aboard HMCS Labrador for search and rescue and varied utility duties, and were later used to support construction at Distant Early Warning Line radar sites. The helicopters were subsequently posted to NAF Patricia Bay and naval air station HMCS Shearwater; after the last two were stricken from inventory on 18 January 1964, one aircraft was donated to a technical school and the other two were sold as surplus.

The US Army H-25 designation was adopted by the US Navy in 1962 on introduction of the 1962 United States Tri-Service aircraft designation system. The final units were withdrawn from US service in 1964. It also served with French Naval Aviation (Aeronavale) from 1953 to 1965.

A total of 339 aircraft were delivered during the 6-year production run. A large number of surplus US Navy aircraft later appeared on the US civil registry, and at least seven were transferred to the French Navy.

On 7 November 2009, former US Navy HUP-1, BuNo 124925, civil registration number N183YP, collided with high-voltage power lines in Adelanto, California; the subsequent crash and post-crash fire killed all 3 occupants and substantially damaged the aircraft. Operated in association with Classic Rotors, the accident aircraft was the only airworthy example in the world. The National Transportation Safety Board attributed the crash to "The pilot’s failure to maintain clearance from powerlines during en route flight."

Variants
XHJP-1
Prototype, powered by a  Continental R-975-34 piston engine, equipped with large sloping endplate fins on the horizontal stabilizers. Piasecki-Vertol designation was PV-14. 2 or 3 produced.

HUP-1
Utility transport and search and rescue helicopter for the US Navy, largely similar to XHJP-1, Piasecki designation was PV-18. 32 built.

HUP-2
Improved version,  Continental R-975-42 piston engine, horizontal stabilizer endplate fins eliminated. 165 built for the US Navy, 15 for French Aeronavale. Redesignated UH-25B in 1962.

HUP-2S
Anti-submarine warfare version of HUP-2 fitted with dunking sonar. 12 built.

HUP-3
Naval utility conversion of H-25A aircraft transferred from US Army: 50 to US Navy, 3 to Royal Canadian Navy.

H-25A Army Mule
Utility transport helicopter for US Army, similar to HUP-2 but powered by a  Continental R-975-46A piston engine, and fitted with large doors, power-boosted controls, and strengthened floors. 70 were delivered from 1953, but they were unsuitable for front-line use, with 53 transferred to the Royal Canadian and US Navies in 1954–1955, and the remaining helicopters used for training, being withdrawn from army service by 1958.

UH-25B
HUP-2 redesignated after 1962.

UH-25C
HUP-3 redesignated after 1962.

Operators
 
 Royal Canadian Navy
 
 French Navy
 
 United States Army
 United States Navy

Surviving aircraft

For surviving aircraft, hyphenated numbers are original US Army Serial Numbers; six-digit numbers are original US Navy Bureau of Aeronautics (BuAer) Bureau Numbers (BuNo). All 50 H-25A/HUP-3 aircraft transferred from the US Army to the US Navy were given new bureau numbers; 3 aircraft transferred to the Royal Canadian Navy  were redesignated, but retained their original US Army serial numbers.

Canada
On display
UH-25B (HUP-2) 128529 at Shearwater Aviation Museum in Shearwater, Nova Scotia. This aircraft has been restored to the appearance of 51-16621, the first Royal Canadian Navy HUP-3.
UH-25C (HUP-3), 51-16623 - Canada Aviation and Space Museum in Ottawa, Ontario.

Netherlands
UH-25B (HUP-2), 130076  (construction number 253) – Baris Business Park roadway roundabout in Rotterdam. This aircraft was originally used by the US Navy and was later transferred to the French Navy.

United Kingdom
UH-25C (HUP-3), 51-16622 – displayed at The Helicopter Museum in Weston-super-Mare, England, wearing Canadian markings.

United States
On display
H-25A Army Mule
51-16616 – United States Army Aviation Museum in Fort Rucker, Alabama.

HUP-1
124915 – USS Hornet Museum in Alameda, California.

UH-25B (HUP-2)
128479 – American Helicopter Museum in West Chester, Pennsylvania.
128517 – Wings of Freedom Aviation Museum in Horsham, Pennsylvania.
128519 – Intrepid Sea, Air & Space Museum in New York City, New York.
128596 – Flying Leatherneck Aviation Museum in San Diego, California.
130059 – USS Midway Museum in San Diego, California.
130082 – on the deck of the USS Iowa Museum in San Pedro, California.

UH-25C (HUP-3)

147595 – Pima Air & Space Museum in Tucson, Arizona.
147600 – Air Zoo in Kalamazoo, Michigan.
147607 – National Naval Aviation Museum in Pensacola, Florida.
147628 – Mid-America Air Museum in Liberal, Kansas.
51-16621 – Classic Rotors in Ramona, California. As of December 2019, this is the only Piasecki Helicopter-manufactured aircraft with valid FAA aircraft registration. This former Royal Canadian Navy aircraft is reportedly the last HUP/H-25 capable of being restored to airworthy condition; it was exchanged in 2000 by the Canadian Museum of Flight for unflyable HUP-2 128529, which was subsequently traded again in 2002 to the Shearwater Aviation Museum and repainted as 51-16621.

Under restoration or in storage
UH-25B (HUP-2)
130053 – Stored at Quartzsite, Arizona.
UH-25C (HUP-3)
147610 – Yanks Air Museum in Chino, California, in storage.

Specifications (HUP-2)

See also

References
Notes

Bibliography
Bridgman, Leonard. Jane's All The World's Aircraft 1956–57. New York: The McGraw-Hill Book Company, 1956.
 Harding, Stephen. U.S. Army Aircraft Since 1947. Shrewsbury, UK:Airlife, 1990. .
.

External links

 H-25 US Army Aviation history fact sheet

United States military helicopters
Tandem rotor helicopters
1950s United States military aircraft
1950s United States helicopters
Piasecki Helicopter aircraft
Single-engined piston helicopters
Aircraft first flown in 1948